Rees Thomas (31 August 1926 – March 1984) was a Welsh rugby union and professional rugby league footballer who played in the 1940s, 1950s and 1960s, and coached rugby league in the 1970s.

Background
Rees Thomas was born in Maesteg, Glamorgan, Wales, he later served in the Royal Navy during World War II, and he died aged 57.

Playing career

International honours
Rees Thomas won a cap for Wales (RL) while at Wigan in the 8-25 defeat by France at Stade des Minimes, Toulouse on Sunday 1 March 1959.

Challenge Cup Final appearances
Rees Thomas played , and was man of the match winning the Lance Todd Trophy in Wigan's 13-9 victory over Workington Town in the 1958 Challenge Cup Final during the 1957–58 season at Wembley Stadium, London on Saturday 10 May 1958, in front of a crowd of 66,109, and played  in the 30-13 victory over Hull F.C. in the 1959 Challenge Cup Final during the 1958–59 season at Wembley Stadium, London on Saturday 9 May 1959, in front of a crowd of 79,811.

Notable tour matches
Rees Thomas played in Swinton's defeat to Australia in the 1952–53 Kangaroo tour of Great Britain and France match during the 1952–53 season.

Club career
Rees Thomas changed rugby football codes from rugby union to rugby league when he transferred from Devonport Services R.F.C. to Swinton, he made his début for Swinton against Dewsbury on Saturday 17 September 1949, and he played his last match (in his second spell) for Swinton against Widnes on Wednesday 27 April 1960, he transferred from Swinton to Wigan at the start of the 1956–57 season.

References

External links
Statistics at wigan.rlfans.com
Photograph 'Bill McGowan about to play-the-ball to Jack Tonge. Rees Thomas in tracksuit' at www.swintonlionstales.co.uk
Search for "Rees Thomas" at britishnewspaperarchive.co.uk

1926 births
1984 deaths
Devonport Services R.F.C. players
Lance Todd Trophy winners
Maesteg RFC players
Place of death missing
Royal Navy personnel of World War II
Royal Navy rugby union players
Rugby league halfbacks
Rugby league players from Maesteg
Rugby union players from Maesteg
Swinton Lions coaches
Swinton Lions players
Wales national rugby league team players
Welsh rugby league coaches
Welsh rugby league players
Welsh rugby union players
Wigan Warriors players